Alexandra "Xandar" Norman (born May 27, 1983) is a professional squash player who represents Canada. She reached a career-high world ranking of World No. 47 in March 2011.

References

External links 

1983 births
Anglophone Quebec people
Canadian female squash players
English emigrants to Canada
Living people
People from Horsham
Sportspeople from Montreal
21st-century Canadian women